Michael Corleone is a fictional character and the protagonist of Mario Puzo's 1969 novel The Godfather. In the three Godfather films, directed by Francis Ford Coppola, Michael was portrayed by Al Pacino, for which he was twice-nominated for Academy Awards. Michael is the youngest son of Vito Corleone, a Sicilian immigrant who builds a Mafia empire. Upon his father's death, Michael succeeds him as the don of the Corleone crime family.

In June 2003, Michael Corleone was recognized as the 11th most iconic villain in film history by the American Film Institute, although some critics consider him to be a tragic hero. The British film magazine Empire selected Michael Corleone as the 11th greatest movie character, with Pacino's performance as Michael Corleone widely regarded as one of the greatest performances in cinematic history.

Family 
Born on March 23, 1920, to Mafia don Vito Corleone (Marlon Brando) and his wife Carmela (Morgana King), Michael has two older brothers, Santino "Sonny" Corleone (James Caan) and Frederico "Fredo" Corleone (John Cazale), and a younger sister, Constanzia "Connie" Corleone (Talia Shire). The family consigliere, Tom Hagen (Robert Duvall), is their informal adopted brother.

The Godfather 
In his novel The Godfather, Mario Puzo introduces Michael with the following physical description: “He did not have the heavy, Cupid-shaped face of [his siblings], and his jet black hair was straight rather than curly. His skin was a clear olive-brown that would have been called beautiful in a girl. He was handsome in a delicate way.” Later in the novel, Puzo writes, “Michael was not tall or heavily built but his presence seemed to radiate danger.”

Unlike his two older brothers, Michael wants nothing to do with the Corleone "family business", wanting instead to lead a more Americanized life. Vito does not want Michael to join the Corleone criminal empire either, hoping that his favorite son would go into politics. Michael was enrolled at Dartmouth College, but dropped out to enlist in the United States Marine Corps the day after the attack on Pearl Harbor. During World War II, he fights in the Pacific War, and is wounded in battle. For his bravery, he received a battlefield commission to the rank of Lieutenant, and was awarded the Silver Star and the Navy Cross. He was discharged as a Captain after V-J Day in the fall of 1945. His heroics during the war were featured in Life magazine.

During the autumn of 1945, Michael is discharged from the Marines, unaware that Vito secretly arranged for his discharge, using his political influence. Michael returns home to attend his sister Connie's wedding, accompanied by Kay Adams (Diane Keaton), his college sweetheart. Michael stays for a few weeks, intending to re-enter college without telling his family.

Just before Christmas 1945, Vito is critically wounded in an assassination attempt by drug kingpin Virgil Sollozzo (Al Lettieri), pushing a reluctant Michael into the Mafia world he has avoided for so long. Arriving at the hospital, he finds his bedridden father unprotected from potential attack. While awaiting Corleone reinforcements, Michael prevents a second assassination attempt on Vito by Sollozzo, then affirms his loyalty to his father. Captain Mark McCluskey (Sterling Hayden), a corrupt NYPD captain on Sollozzo's payroll, breaks Michael's jaw before more Corleone button men arrive.

As Vito Corleone recuperates, Sollozzo requests that Michael broker a truce, but acting boss Sonny, suspecting a trap, refuses and demands the other Mafia families hand over Sollozzo to the Corleone family or else face war. Michael volunteers to meet Sollozzo in a public place and kill him and McCluskey. Hagen warns that killing McCluskey would violate a long-standing Mafia rule not to kill police officers, and says it would incite deadly backlash from rival Mafia families and law enforcement. Michael argues they can publicly expose McCluskey as a corrupt cop involved in the drug trade and serving as Sollozzo's bodyguard, contending that McCluskey has crossed into their world and is fair game. Sonny agrees and approves the hit.

After careful preparation, Michael meets with Sollozzo and McCluskey at an Italian restaurant in The Bronx. He retrieves a handgun that Corleone caporegime Peter Clemenza (Richard Castellano) had planted beforehand in the bathroom and kills Sollozzo and McCluskey by shooting them at point-blank range. This ignites the New York underworld's first Mafia war in a decade.

Michael escapes to Sicily and spends two years under Corleone ally Don Tommasino's (Corrado Gaipa) protection. Michael falls in love with and marries a young local woman named Apollonia Vitelli (Simonetta Stefanelli). Back in the United States, Sonny is murdered. After Michael is notified of Sonny's murder, he and Apollonia prepare to move to Siracusa, but she is killed by a car bomb meant for Michael, proving the other Mafia families know where he is hiding.

Michael returns to the United States in 1950 and assumes Sonny's role as Vito's heir apparent. After Vito's suspicions are confirmed that Don Emilio Barzini (Richard Conte), his main rival in New York City, is the mastermind of his shooting and Sonny's murder, he and Michael begin a secret, complex plot to wipe out the other New York Dons. They deliberately allow their rivals to whittle away at Corleone interests to lull them into inaction. Meanwhile, Michael convinces his father that it is time to remove the family from crime. More than a year following his return, Michael reunites with Kay and they marry. He promises her the Corleone family will be completely legitimate in five years. Within three years, they have two children, Anthony and Mary.

Vito semi-retires in 1954, and Michael becomes operating head of the family. He offers to buy out casino owner Moe Greene's (Alex Rocco) stake in the Las Vegas casino that the Corleones bankrolled, intending to move the family to Nevada as part of his effort to legitimize the Corleone interests; Greene refuses to sell. Corleone family caporegimes Salvatore Tessio (Abe Vigoda) and Clemenza request permission to begin operating their own families in Corleone territory. Michael, with Vito's support, advises them to be patient and wait until the move to Las Vegas is completed. Tessio and Clemenza agree, but are clearly dissatisfied.

In 1955, Vito warns Michael that Barzini will likely attempt to assassinate Michael under the pretense of negotiating peace between the families, using a disloyal contact within the Corleone regime. Whoever approaches Michael about the meeting, Vito explains, will be the traitor within the family. Shortly thereafter, Vito dies of a heart attack while playing with his grandson Anthony in his tomato garden.

At Vito's funeral, Tessio tells Michael that Barzini wants to arrange a meeting, confirming Vito's prediction. Michael sets his plan in motion to murder the other New York Mafia heads: Barzini, Philip Tattaglia (Victor Rendina), Carmine Cuneo (Rudy Bond), and Victor Stracci (Don Costello), as well as Greene. The plot unfolds on the same day Michael stands as godfather to Connie's newborn son. Later the same day, he has Tessio and Carlo Rizzi (Gianni Russo), Connie's abusive husband who conspired in Sonny's murder, executed. In one stroke, Michael re-establishes the Corleone family as the nation's most powerful crime family and establishes a reputation as being even more cunning and ruthless than his father.

A few days later, Connie furiously accuses Michael of murdering Carlo. When challenged by Kay, Michael denies having ordered Carlo's murder. Kay, initially believing Michael, later observes him receiving his capos. Clemenza addresses Michael as "Don Corleone" and kisses his hand in the same manner that he did with Michael's father. Kay realizes Connie's accusations were true, and that Michael has become a powerful Don becoming his father's successor in every way. In the novel, Kay leaves Michael, but Hagen persuades her to return.

The Godfather Part II 
The Godfather Part II is set in 1958 and 1959. The Corleone family has relocated to Nevada, while capo Frank Pentangeli (Michael V. Gazzo) runs the family's operations in New York, Clemenza having died a few years before. Although Michael is the most powerful Mafia leader in the nation, he still actively works to remove the Corleone family from crime. His efforts have been largely unsuccessful, however, as his many enemies and growing obsession with revenge keep him tethered to the criminal underworld. Michael plans to finally legitimize the family by negotiating with Hyman Roth (Lee Strasberg), his father's former business partner, over controlling casino operations in Cuba.

Hours after Anthony's First Communion party, unseen gunmen shoot at the Corleone house, nearly killing Michael and Kay. Michael suspects Roth ordered the hit, and believes a mole within the Corleone family aided him. To uncover Roth's involvement, Michael maintains their business relationship, and orders Pentangeli to settle a dispute with Roth's business partners, the Rosato Brothers. When Pentangeli meets with them, they try to kill him, but he survives.

Michael, Roth, and Fredo travel to Cuba to forge a partnership with Fulgencio Batista allowing them to operate casinos in Cuba without interference in exchange for generous payments to the Cuban government. Michael sends his bodyguard to eliminate Roth on New Year's Eve, but Cuban soldiers kill the bodyguard during the attempt. That same night, Fredo unintentionally reveals that he was the mole within the family; Michael confronts Fredo and gives him the Sicilian "kiss of death". During the New Year's Eve festivities, victorious rebel forces enter Havana, forcing Batista into exile and ruining Michael's plans. Fredo, afraid of his brother, runs off; Roth escapes to Miami.

Meanwhile, Pentangeli, believing Michael had ordered a hit on him, prepares to testify against him in the Senate's investigation of organized crime. However, Michael has Pentangeli's brother Vincenzo (Salvatore Po) brought from Sicily. Just prior to the hearing, Vincenzo and Frank exchange glances. Understanding the threat, Pentangeli recants his earlier sworn statements, throwing the hearings into chaos and effectively destroying the government's case against Michael.

Fredo confesses to Michael that Roth's right-hand man, Johnny Ola (Dominic Chianese), had promised to reward him for information about Michael. Fredo says that he resents being "passed over" to head the family in favor of Michael, and that he withheld key information about the Senate investigation. Michael disowns Fredo, and tells his personal assassin Al Neri that nothing is to happen to his brother while their mother is alive — the implication being that Neri is to kill Fredo after she dies.

Meanwhile, Kay decides to leave Michael and take their children with her, believing Michael will always live in a world of crime and violence. Michael asks her to reconsider, but Kay reveals she aborted their unborn son because she refused to bring another of his children into the world. Enraged, Michael hits Kay in the face and severs ties with her, taking custody of Anthony and Mary.

Following their mother's death, and at Connie's behest, Michael seemingly forgives Fredo, but it is actually a ploy to draw him in closer in order to have him killed. Soon after, Neri murders Fredo on Michael's orders. At the same time, Michael sends Hagen to persuade Pentangeli to commit suicide to spare his family, and has caporegime Rocco Lampone (Tom Rosqui) kill a heavily guarded Roth at Idlewild Airport upon his return to the US.

The film ends as Michael recalls a surprise birthday party for his father on December 7, 1941. In a flashback scene, Michael informs the family that he has dropped out of college to enlist in the Marines. Only Fredo supports Michael's decision. When Vito arrives off-screen, everyone goes to greet him except Michael, who sits alone. The film closes with Michael sitting alone in the Corleones' Lake Tahoe compound.

The Godfather Part III 
The Godfather Part III is set in 1979 and 1980. Michael has moved back to New York, abandoned the Nevada estate, and taken great strides to remove the family from crime.

He turns over his New York criminal interests to longtime enforcer Joey Zasa (Joe Mantegna). Ridden with guilt over his ruthless rise to power, particularly his order to eliminate Fredo, Michael uses his expanding wealth in an attempt to rehabilitate his reputation through numerous acts of charity, administered by a foundation named after his father.

A decade earlier, he had given custody of his two children to Kay, who has since remarried. He sells his gambling interests to other Mafia families and reorganizes his vast legitimate business holdings as the "Corleone Group".

The Holy See has named him a Commander of the Order of Saint Sebastian for his charitable works and large donations to Catholic institutions.

At the ceremony, Michael and Kay have an uneasy reunion after nine years. Kay supports their son Anthony's (Franc D'Ambrosio) ambition to reject the "family business" and become an opera singer, and tells Michael that both she and Anthony know the truth about Fredo's death.

Michael had previously wanted Anthony to either finish law school or join the family business, but now consents to Anthony going his own way.

Michael's new connection to the Church provides an opportunity to take over the large property company, Immobiliare. He is already its largest shareholder, and offers to buy the Vatican's 25 percent share, which will give him controlling interest. He also takes in Sonny's illegitimate son Vincent Mancini (Andy Garcia), a soldier in Zasa's crew, as his protégé. Vincent is the son of Sonny Corleone and Lucy Mancini, conceived during the wedding reception which serves as the opening sequence of The Godfather.

In a private meeting during Michael's reception following his acceptance of the St. Sebastian medal, Vincent accuses Zasa of working against Michael's interests.

Michael attempts to defuse the conflict, but Vincent attacks Zasa directly, biting off part of his ear.

Michael recognizes that Vincent has inherited Sonny's fiery temper and fears Vincent will suffer his father's fate, making crucial misjudgments fueled by anger.

Michael's sister Connie Corleone, who has abandoned her jet-setting socialite lifestyle to live with Michael, now urges him to accept Vincent in Family operations and support him in conflicts against Zasa.

Michael wryly observes Connie beginning to assume an active role in discussions of illegal family operations. (In The Godfather, Part II, Connie had still maintained ignorance of, or at least non-involvement in, the family's illegitimate activities.)

Michael also disapproves of the romance developing between Vincent and Michael's daughter, Mary (Sofia Coppola). 

Apparently dismissing the incestuous aspects of the relationship (first cousins), Michael fears that Vincent's growing involvement in the Mafia will endanger Mary, just as it did Michael's first wife, Apollonia, ultimately leading to her death.

On the night Michael announces he is dissolving his gambling empire, Zasa wipes out most of The Commission in a helicopter attack in Atlantic City.

Michael escapes with help from Vincent and Neri. Just prior to the attack, Zasa bitterly confronts Michael, signaling open warfare among the mob families.

Believing Zasa too limited to pull off such an ambitious assault, Michael realizes that old Corleone family friend, Don Altobello (Eli Wallach), is the brains behind the attempt on his life. Traumatized by the attack, Michael suffers a diabetic stroke, briefly incapacitating him. (Francis Ford Coppola reveals in his audio commentary that Michael is frequently seen drinking water in the first two films—subtle hints that he is a diabetic.)

With Michael still bedridden, Connie (for the first time assuming a formal role in the Corleone Family's criminal activities) gives Vincent consent to assassinate Zasa.

Disguised as an NYPD mounted officer, Vincent accomplishes this with a brazen horseback attack in the middle of an Italian street festival.

Knowing that escalating mob violence runs the risk of endangering his plan to acquire Immobiliare, a now-recovering Michael is furious when receiving the news of the Zasa hit, and demands that no similar orders be issued while he is alive.

Michael demands full acceptance to his authority in a hospital room meeting with Neri, Vincent and Connie—implicitly acknowledging Connie's stature as an active participant in Family affairs.

A seemingly healthy Michael returns to Sicily for Anthony's operatic debut at the Teatro Massimo. Suspecting that Altobello may make another attempt on his life, he has Vincent infiltrate Altobello's regime under the pretense of defecting.

Michael and Kay tour Sicily together, during which Michael asks for Kay's forgiveness. Kay admits she will always love him, and they begin to rekindle their relationship.

Meanwhile, the Immobiliare deal has stalled, supposedly because the critically ill Pope Paul VI must personally approve it. Michael learns that the Immobiliare deal is an elaborate swindle concocted by Immobiliare chairman Licio Lucchesi (Enzo Robutti), who schemed with Vatican Bank head Archbishop Gilday (Donal Donnelly) and accountant Frederick Keinszig (Helmut Berger) to embezzle a fortune from the Vatican Bank, using Michael's "investment" to cover their tracks. Hoping to salvage the deal, Michael seeks Don Tommasino's assistance. He directs Michael to Cardinal Lamberto (Raf Vallone), the future Pope John Paul I. With Lamberto's prodding, Michael makes his first confession in 30 years, tearfully breaking down as he admits to ordering Fredo's murder. Lamberto tells Michael he deserves to suffer for his terrible sins, but that there is hope for his redemption.

John Paul I dies soon after being elected pope, poisoned by Gilday. Michael learns that Altobello (in league with the conspirators) has hired an assassin named Mosca (Mario Donatone) to kill him. Mosca murders Tommasino, and Michael vows before his old friend's casket to sin no more. Vincent reports that Lucchesi, working with Altobello, is behind the assassination attempts on Michael.

Weary of the bloody, lonely life of a Don, Michael retires, making Vincent his successor, but not before giving him permission to retaliate. In return, Vincent agrees to end his romance with Mary. That night, Michael, reconciled with Kay and Anthony, watches his son's performance in the opera Cavalleria Rusticana. Meanwhile, Vincent has Lucchesi, Gilday and Keinszig murdered; Lucchesi is stabbed to death in his office by Tommasino's longtime bodyguard, Calò, Gilday is shot to death by Neri on the cathedral stairs and Keinszig is abducted, suffocated and left to hang from a bridge, and Connie murders Altobello with a poisoned cannoli.

After the performance, Mosca shoots Michael, wounding him, and a second bullet hits Mary, killing her. Mary's death breaks Michael's spirit, and he screams in agony over her body. In an epilogue scene set in 1997, an elderly Michael (age 77) lives alone in Don Tommasino's villa. Sitting in the same courtyard where he married Apollonia, he suddenly slumps over in his chair and falls to the ground. In the December 2020 release of The Godfather Coda: The Death of Michael Corleone, a recut of the third film, the final scene is re-edited to make Michael's death more indefinite and imply he might have lived even longer into old age in isolation, with many of his family members dead.

The Sicilian 
Michael is a secondary character in Puzo's novel The Sicilian, which takes place during his first exile in Sicily. He learns from Clemenza about the legendary exploits of the novel's main character, Salvatore Guiliano (In the novel, the spelling of Salvatore Giuliano's name was intentionally changed by Puzo to "Guiliano".), and is eager to meet him, but Giuliano is murdered before the meeting can take place.

Sequel novels
Michael appears in Mark Winegardner's sequel novels The Godfather Returns and The Godfather's Revenge. In Godfather Returns, set roughly during the time of Godfather Part II, Michael battles with a new rival, disgruntled Corleone capo Nick Geraci, while attempting to legitimize the family. In The Godfather's Revenge, set a few years after the second film, he moves to protect his criminal empire against Geraci and the machinations of a powerful political dynasty, while dealing with the collapse of his marriage and his guilt over having Fredo murdered. In the latter novel, he has a relationship with actress Marguerite "Rita" Duvall in the early 1960s, but he ends it upon realizing that he is still in love with Kay.

Family members 
 Vito CorleoneMichael's father and head of the Corleone crime family, played by Marlon Brando in The Godfather, and by Robert De Niro in flashback scenes in Part II
 Carmela CorleoneMother, played by Morgana King in The Godfather Part I and Part II, and by Francesca De Sapio in flashback scenes in Part II
 Tom HagenAdopted brother and consigliere, played by Robert Duvall
 Santino "Sonny" CorleoneEldest brother, underboss to Vito, played by James Caan in The Godfather Part 1, and by Roman Coppola in flashback scenes from Part II
 Constanzia "Connie" CorleoneYounger sister, played by Talia Shire
 Frederico "Fredo" CorleoneElder brother, underboss to Michael; played by John Cazale
 Apollonia Vitelli-CorleoneFirst wife, played by Simonetta Stefanelli
 Kay Adams-CorleoneSecond wife, played by Diane Keaton
 Anthony CorleoneSon, played by Anthony Gounaris in The Godfather, by James Gounaris in Part II, and by Franc D'Ambrosio in Part III
 Mary CorleoneDaughter, played by an uncredited actress in Part II, and by Sofia Coppola in Part III
 Vincent CorleoneNephew and succeeding Don, played by Andy García

References

Bibliography

The Godfather characters
Characters in American novels of the 20th century
Characters in American novels of the 21st century
Cultural depictions of the Mafia
Fictional characters from New York City
Fictional crime bosses
Fictional domestic abusers
Fictional fratricides
Fictional Italian American people
Fictional mass murderers
Male film villains
Male literary villains
Fictional military personnel in films
Fictional United States Marine Corps personnel
Fictional World War II veterans
Literary characters introduced in 1969
Male characters in literature
Fictional people from the 20th-century
Film characters introduced in 1972